Bob Welch (born c. 1954) is an American author, speaker, teacher and newspaper columnist from Oregon.  He writes a column for The Register-Guard, and is an adjunct professor at the University of Oregon.  He has been honored multiple times by the National Society of Newspaper Columnists, and won many awards, including The Seattle Times C.B. Blethen Award for Distinguished Feature Writing.

Published works
Among his books are:
 52 Little Lessons from a Christmas Carol (Thomas Nelson, 2015)
 52 Little Lessons from Les Miserables (Thomas Nelson, 2014)
 The Keyboard Kitten: Gets Oregonized (penwax design, 2014)
 The Keyboard Kitten: An Oregon Children's Story (penwax design, 2013)
 My Seasons: A Literary Celebration of Sports and Life (AO Creative, 2006)
 My Oregon (AO Creative), a compilation of columns he wrote between 1999 and 2005
 American Nightingale: The Story of Francis Slanger, Forgotten Heroine of Normandy (Atria, 2001)
 Where Roots Grow Deep: Stories of Family, Love, and Legacy (Harvest House Publishers, 1999)
 A Father for All Seasons (Harvest House Publishers, 1998)

References

External links
 Bob Welch home page

University of Oregon faculty
American columnists
Writers from Eugene, Oregon
1955 births
Living people